Centro ("downtown") is a bairro in the District of Sede in the municipality of Santa Maria, in the Brazilian state of Rio Grande do Sul. It is the economical heart of Santa Maria.

Villages 
The bairro contains the following villages: Astrogildo de Azevedo A, Astrogildo de Azevedo B, Centro, Parque Centenário, Parque Itaimbé, Rizzato Irmãos, Vila Belga, Vila Crispim Pereira, Vila Felipe de Oliveira, Vila José Azenha, Vila José Moraes, Vila Major Duarte, Vila Zulmira.;

Gallery of photos

References 

Bairros of Santa Maria, Rio Grande do Sul